Xinhai Lhasa turmoil refers to the ethnic clash in the Lhasa region of Tibet and various mutinies following the Wuchang Uprising. It effectively resulted in the end of Qing rule in Tibet.

Background
The Wuchang Uprising unfolded on October 10, 1911, and marked the beginning of the Xinhai Revolution. Turmoil in the frontier regions of China began to spread. The revolutionaries led by Sun Yat-sen insisted on "getting rid of the Tartars" and rejected the Manchus, creating a new government based completely on Han-dominated China proper.

Turmoil in Tibet
The influence of the Wuchang Uprising rapidly spread to the frontier region. Qing armies in Tibet ended up struggling against each other, and as a result, Tibet fell into a state of anarchy. In the winter of 1911, the Qing Governor of Sichuan, Zhao Erfeng, was executed by radicals, and the situation turned worse as Xikang fell into turmoil as well. As a result, the Dalai Lama was able to eliminate Qing influence in Tibet and return as the sole administrator of the region. The Qing army in Tibet was unable to resist the Dalai Lama's forces, and fled back to inland China via India.

See also
Tibet under Qing rule
Lhasa riot of 1750
Chinese expedition to Tibet (1910)
Tibet (1912–51)
Tibetan independence movement
Dalai Lama
Xinhai Revolution

References

History of Tibet
Rebellions in the Qing dynasty
Separatism in China